Tom Kingsley is an English TV and film director. He is best known for directing Ghosts and three-time BAFTA-winning Channel 4 sitcom Stath Lets Flats. His work has been nominated for the 2012 BAFTAs, the 2011 British Independent Film Awards, the Guardian First Film Award, the Evening Standard Film Awards, and the Raindance Film Festival.

Education
Kingsley was educated at Eton College, a boarding independent school for boys in Eton in Berkshire, followed by Gonville and Caius College, Cambridge, where he studied English, and was a member of the comedy group Footlights, directing the Footlights Revue "Wham Bam" at the 2007 Edinburgh Fringe.

Life and career
In 2008, Kingsley worked as a runner at Blink, the Soho-based production company, after sending them a DVD containing several of his short films. Over the next year, he began directing music videos and commercials.

In 2011 Kingsley and Will Sharpe released their low-budget feature-length film Black Pond. The film led to Kingsley and Sharpe being nominated for Outstanding Debut at the Baftas, and winning Most Promising Newcomer(s) at the Evening Standard Film Awards. It was listed as a film of the year in the New Statesman and the Financial Times.

In 2022, Kingsley directed the second of the 60th anniversary specials for Doctor Who, to be screened in 2023.

Filmography

Feature films 
The Darkest Universe (2016)
Black Pond (2011)

TV series 

 Stath Lets Flats (2018)
 Pls Like (2017)
 Ghosts (2019)
 This Is Going to Hurt (2021)
 Doctor Who (2023)

References

External links
Official website

Kingsley's YouTube channel

1985 births
Advertising directors
Alumni of Gonville and Caius College, Cambridge
British music video directors
Living people
Film directors from London
People educated at Eton College